Joseph Namariau is a Vanuatuan footballer who plays as a forward.

References

External links
 

Living people
1988 births
Vanuatuan footballers
Vanuatu international footballers
Tafea F.C. players
2012 OFC Nations Cup players
Association football forwards